Desde Andalucía (English: From Andalusia) is a studio album by Spanish singer Isabel Pantoja, released in 1988. The album became a success on the Latin Pop Albums charts. The album received a Lo Nuestro award for Pop Album of the Year. By 1993 the record had sold over 1.3 million copies.

Track listing 
 "Hazme Tuya Una Vez Más" – 6:09
 "Queriendo y No" – 5:15
 "Ojos Azules Como el Mar" – 4:07
 "Hoy Todos Mis Días" – 8:13
 "Cuántos Días Más" – 4:18
 "Así Fue" – 5:32
 "Luna Llena" – 5:59
 "Recordándote" – 5:40
 "Virgen del Rocío" – 6:00

Chart performance

References 

1988 albums
Isabel Pantoja albums
RCA Records albums